Wahi Annuar was a Malayan communist.  He took to the forests at the beginning of the Malayan emergency. He was a leader in the MRLA 10th Malay Regiment. However, he surrendered to the British in February 1950.

Malaysian communists
Malaysian independence activists
Year of birth missing
Year of death missing